Juul is a Danish and Norwegian surname and given name. Notable people with the name include:

Surname
Christopher Juul-Jensen (born 1989), Danish racing cyclist
Erling Juul (1897–1989), Norwegian track and field athlete
Herb Juul (1886–1928), Major League Baseball pitcher, college basketball player, coach
Herold Juul (1893–1942), professional baseball player, pitcher for the Brooklyn Tip-Tops
Jesper Juul (family therapist) (1948–2019), Danish family therapist and author
Jesper Juul (game researcher), game designer, educator, and theorist in video game studies
Johannes Juul (1887–1969), Danish engineer, developer of wind turbines
Mona Juul (born 1959), official in the Norwegian Ministry of Foreign Affairs, former politician for the Labour Party
Niels Juul (1859–1929), U.S. Representative from Illinois
Nille Juul-Sørensen (born 1958), Danish architect
Ove Juul (1615–1686), Danish nobleman, Vice Governor-general of Norway under Ulrik Fredrik Gyldenløve from 1669 to 1674
Pia Juul (1962–2020), Danish poet, prose writer and translator
Soren Lokke Juul, Danish singer-songwriter and musician known as Indians
Kasper Juul, fictional character played by Pilou Asbæk in the Danish TV series Borgen

Given name
Juul Bjerke (1928–2014), Norwegian economist
Jens Juul Eriksen (born 1926), Danish cyclist
Juul Haalmeyer, costume designer
Holger Juul Hansen (1924–2013), Danish actor
Morten Juul Hansen (born 1977), Danish football player
Dorte Juul Jensen, senior scientist and head of the Center for Fundamental Research
Davur Juul Magnussen, Faroese Trombonist from Tórshavn, Faroe Islands
Søren Juul Petersen (born 1963), Danish independent film producer

See also
 Jouault
 Juhl